The 2015 Gorzów FIM Speedway Grand Prix of Poland was the eighth race of the 2015 Speedway Grand Prix season. It took place on August 30 at the Edward Jancarz Stadium in Gorzów, Poland.

Riders 
First reserve Peter Kildemand replaced Jarosław Hampel, who had injured himself during the 2015 Speedway World Cup. The Speedway Grand Prix Commission also nominated 2014 winner Bartosz Zmarzlik as the wild card, and Adrian Cyfer and Rafal Karczmarz both as Track Reserves.

Results 
The Grand Prix was won by Matej Žagar, who beat Greg Hancock, Tai Woffinden and wild card Bartosz Zmarzlik in the final. Woffinden had initially top scored with a maximum 15 points during the qualifying rides, however he was beaten by Zmarzlik in the semi-finals and then had to settle for third in the decider. He did eventually score 18 points though, and thus extended his overall lead over Nicki Pedersen to 24 points in the race for the world title.

Heat details

The intermediate classification

References

See also 
 motorcycle speedway

2015 Speedway Grand Prix
2015 in Polish speedway